Elections to Ards Borough Council were held on 5 May 2005 on the same day as the other Northern Irish local government elections. The election used four district electoral areas to elect a total of 23 councillors.

Election results

Note: "Votes" are the first preference votes.

Districts summary

|- class="unsortable" align="centre"
!rowspan=2 align="left"|Ward
! % 
!Cllrs
! % 
!Cllrs
! %
!Cllrs
! %
!Cllrs
! %
!Cllrs
!rowspan=2|TotalCllrs
|- class="unsortable" align="center"
!colspan=2 bgcolor="" | DUP
!colspan=2 bgcolor="" | UUP
!colspan=2 bgcolor="" | Alliance
!colspan=2 bgcolor="" | SDLP
!colspan=2 bgcolor="white"| Others
|-
|align="left"|Ards East
|bgcolor="#D46A4C"|56.1
|bgcolor="#D46A4C"|4
|28.6
|2
|11.2
|0
|0.0
|0
|4.1
|0
|6
|-
|align="left"|Ards West
|bgcolor="#D46A4C"|53.0
|bgcolor="#D46A4C"|3
|31.8
|2
|15.3
|1
|0.0
|0
|0.0
|0
|6
|-
|align="left"|Newtownards
|bgcolor="#D46A4C"|50.8
|bgcolor="#D46A4C"|2
|24.3
|2
|14.4
|1
|0.0
|0
|10.5
|0
|6
|-
|align="left"|Peninsula
|bgcolor="#D46A4C"|48.8
|bgcolor="#D46A4C"|2
|11.4
|1
|16.0
|1
|14.8
|1
|9.0
|0
|5
|- class="unsortable" class="sortbottom" style="background:#C9C9C9"
|align="left"| Total
|52.4
|12
|24.5
|7
|14.1
|3
|3.4
|1
|5.6
|0
|23
|-
|}

Districts results

Ards East

2001: 3 x UUP, 2 x DUP, 1 x Alliance
2005: 4 x DUP, 2 x UUP
2001-2005 Change: DUP gain (two seats) from UUP and Alliance

Ards West

2001: 3 x DUP, 2 x UUP, 1 x Alliance
2005: 3 x DUP, 2 x UUP, 1 x Alliance
2001-2005 Change: No change

Newtownards

2001: 2 x DUP, 2 x UUP, 1 x Alliance, 1 x Independent
2005: 3 x DUP, 2 x UUP, 1 x Alliance
2001-2005 Change: DUP gain from Independent

Peninsula

2001: 2 x DUP, 1 x Alliance, 1 x SDLP, 1 x UUP
2005: 2 x DUP, 1 x Alliance, 1 x SDLP, 1 x UUP
2001-2005 Change: No change

References

Ards Borough Council elections
Ards